Vanessa Peh Ting Ting (born 16 December 1994) is a Singaporean actress, model, entrepreneur and beauty pageant titleholder who was crowned Miss Singapore World 2018 on 14 September 2018. She represented Singapore at the Miss World 2018 pageant and advanced to the Top 30 of Miss World Grand Final.

Personal life 
Vanessa was raised in Singapore. Her father and mother are Chinese. She is an actress, model and entrepreneur by profession. She has studied in Nanyang Polytechnic and majored in Medicinal Chemistry and interned at Agency for Science, Technology and Research, Institute of Molecular and Cell Biology (IMCB). She is multilingual with the ability to speak English, Mandarin, French and Hokkien. She was also a ballet student in the Royal Academy of Dance in London and a piano student, graduating with distinctions from ABRSM.

Pageantry

Miss Singapore World 2018 
Vanessa is the winner of Miss World Singapore 2018. She was crowned as Miss Singapore World 2018 pageant at Resorts World Sentosa on 14 September 2018.

In addition to the crown, she also won two subsidiary awards in the Miss World Singapore competition:
 Miss Personality
 Miss Beautiful Hair

Miss World 2018 
Peh represented Singapore at Miss World 2018 pageant in Sanya, China where she made history by advancing to the Top 30 of Miss World Grand Final.

Peh was the winner among of Group 14 in the Head-to-Head Challenge. During the Final round of Group 7 in the Head-to-Head Challenge, she won Nepal, which placed Singapore in Top 30 among 118 contestants of Miss World 2018.

Career 
Modelling

In 2017, Vanessa started her modelling career. She has done various commercials and campaigns for brands including but not limited to Singapore Airlines, Hewlett-Packard Singapore, Meiji Seika Singapore, Anlene, PayPal Singapore, Philosophy (brand).

Filmography

Television

English Series

Chinese Series

References

External links
 

1994 births
Living people
Miss World 2018 delegates
Singaporean female models
Singaporean beauty pageant winners
Singaporean actresses
Singaporean television actresses
Singaporean television personalities
Singaporean people of Chinese descent